Köyceğiz is a town and district of Muğla Province in the Aegean region of Turkey.

The town of Köyceğiz lies at the northern end of a lake of the same name (Köyceğiz Lake) which is joined to the Mediterranean Sea by a natural channel called Dalyan Delta. Its unique environment is being preserved as a nature and wildlife sanctuary, the Köyceğiz-Dalyan Special Environmental Protection Area. A road shaded with trees leads to the township that carries the same name as the river, Dalyan, which is situated on the inland waterway and is administratively a part of the neighboring district of Ortaca. Dalyan is highly popular with visitors and its maze of channels can be explored by boat. The restaurants which line the waterways specialize in fresh fish. High on the cliff face, at a bend in the river, above the ancient harbor city of Caunos, tombs were carved into the rocks. The Dalyan Delta, with a long, golden sandy beach at its mouth, is a nature conservation area and a refuge for rare loggerhead turtles (Caretta caretta) and blue crabs.

References

External links
 District municipality's official website 
 Köyceğiz Pictures
 Köyceğiz Travel Guide

Populated places in Muğla Province
Turkish Riviera
Fishing communities in Turkey
Districts of Muğla Province
Cittaslow